The following is a list of Public holidays in Jamaica, which includes Christian holidays and secular holidays.

Public holidays 
 New Year's Day, 1 January (public holiday)
 Ash Wednesday, Between 4 February and 10 March (public holiday)
 Good Friday, Friday of Holy Week, late March or early April(public holiday)
 Easter Monday, Monday after Easter(public holiday) 
 Labour Day, 23 May (public holiday) People participate in community improvement projects.
 Emancipation Day, 1 August (public holiday). Honors the 311,000 slaves freed in 1840.
 Independence Day, 6 August (public holiday). Independence from the British Empire in 1962.
 National Heroes Day, Third Monday of October (public holiday). Honors Alexander Bustamante, Nanny of the Maroons, and five other heroes.
 Christmas Day, 25 December (religious and public holiday)
 Boxing Day, 26 December (public holiday)

References

 
Society of Jamaica
Jamaican culture
Jamaica
Holidays